Sir Robert Carrington Cotton,  (29 November 191525 December 2006) was an Australian politician and diplomat. He was a member of the Liberal Party and served as a Senator for New South Wales from 1966 to 1978. He held ministerial office as Minister for Civil Aviation (1969–1972), Science and Consumer Affairs (1975), and Industry and Commerce (1975–1977). He later served as Consul-General in New York (1978–1982) and Ambassador to the United States (1982–1985).

Early life
Cotton was born in Broken Hill, New South Wales in 1915.  He was educated at St Peter's College, Adelaide and trained as a Royal Australian Air Force pilot in 1942 and 1943, but did not participate in action in World War II as he was seconded to the Department of Supply.  Instead Cotton established the timber industry in Oberon, New South Wales as a wartime priority.

After the war Cotton became a businessman and pastoralist in Oberon. In 1949 and 1950 he was President of Oberon Shire Council.

Politics
Cotton was a member of the Liberal Party of Australia from its foundation, and in the 1949 federal election he ran unsuccessfully for the seat of Macquarie against the sitting Australian Labor Party member, Prime Minister Ben Chifley.
He again lost to Chifley, now Leader of the Opposition, in 1951.

From 1957 to 1960 he was New South Wales State President of the Liberal Party.

Senate
Cotton was appointed to the Senate to fill a vacancy caused by the resignation of Sir William Spooner in August 1965. The Australian Constitution dictated that a special Senate election had to be held at the same time as the lower house 1966 election, but Cotton was re-elected. He was re-elected in 1967, 1974 and 1975. He was Minister for Civil Aviation from 1969 to 1972, responsible for the Department of Civil Aviation. During Cotton's term as Minister, the Department introduced security legislations to exclude non-passengers from international airport departure terminals. Cotton was Minister for Industry and Commerce from 1975 to 1977.

Later life
Cotton retired from Parliament in 1978.  He was Australian Consul-General in New York from 1978 to 1981.  He was a director of the Reserve Bank of Australia in 1981 and 1982 and was the Australian Ambassador to the United States from 1982 to 1985, and from 1991 to 1994 he was Chairman of the Australian National Gallery Foundation.
  
He died on Christmas Day 2006 in Sydney aged 91 after a long illness.  He was survived by his second wife, two daughters and a son, three stepchildren, seven grandchildren, four great-grandchildren and a sister.

Honours
Cotton was knighted in 1978 and was made an Officer of the Order of Australia (AO) in 1993. He received a Doctorate of Science from the University of Sydney in 1995.

References

 

1915 births
2006 deaths
Liberal Party of Australia members of the Parliament of Australia
Members of the Australian Senate
Members of the Australian Senate for New South Wales
Members of the Cabinet of Australia
Australian Knights Commander of the Order of St Michael and St George
Australian politicians awarded knighthoods
Officers of the Order of Australia
Recipients of the Centenary Medal
Ambassadors of Australia to the United States
People educated at St Peter's College, Adelaide
20th-century Australian politicians
Consuls-General of Australia in New York
Government ministers of Australia
Royal Australian Air Force personnel of World War II
Australian World War II pilots
People from Broken Hill, New South Wales